Rémi Raymond (December 5, 1811 – July 15, 1891) was a businessman, farmer and political figure in Quebec. He represented St. Hyacinthe in the Legislative Assembly of the Province of Canada from 1863 to 1866.

He was born Augustin-Rémi Raymond in Saint-Hyacinthe, Quebec, the son of Joseph Raymond and Louise Cartier, and was educated at Saint-Hyacinthe college. Raymond was a founding director of the Banque de Saint-Hyacinthe and of the Compagnie d'imprimerie de Saint-Hyacinthe, which printed the Courrier de Saint-Hyacinthe. He was married three times: to Héloïse Bouthillier in 1838; to Sophie Lapart in 1850; and finally to Emma Birs in 1870. He was elected to the Legislative Assembly in an 1863 by-election held after Louis-Victor Sicotte was named a judge. Raymond ran unsuccessfully for a seat in the Canadian House of Commons in 1867. He died in Saint-Hyacinthe at the age of 79.

His sister Adèle married Augustin-Norbert Morin.

References 

1811 births
1891 deaths
Members of the Legislative Assembly of the Province of Canada from Canada East